Martin Murphy Ferguson (born 21 December 1942) is a Scottish former football player, manager and scout and current chairman of Airdrieonians. He is the brother of former Manchester United manager Alex Ferguson. He was Manchester United's chief European scout, and as such he was often sent to monitor players in mainland Europe.

Career
Ferguson began his playing career at Kirkintilloch Rob Roy where he was capped for Scotland at Junior level before stepping up to Partick Thistle in 1962. He went on to Morton then a brief spell in the Football League during the mid-1960s.

He was appointed player-coach at Waterford in July 1967. He made his Blues debut in Peter Fitzgerald's testimonial in August 1967. His first league goal came in the dying seconds of a home clash with Shamrock Rovers on 19 November which led to Ferguson being chaired off the pitch. He was let go in February 1968.

He later worked as a coach at Hibernian, but was sacked in 1997. He was signed by Manchester United on the recommendation of his brother Alex, and scouted players such as future signings Diego Forlán, Anderson, and Ruud van Nistelrooy, as well as others who did not join the club including Fabio Quagliarella and Alessandro Nesta. Ferguson retired from his position as chief scout for Manchester United in May 2013, the same time as his brother retired as manager.

In January 2018, Ferguson was announced as vice-chairman of Airdrieonians In December of the same year, he became the North Lanarkshire club's chairman.

Honours
Waterford
League of Ireland: 1967–68
Top Four Cup: 1967–68

References

External links

1942 births
Living people
Footballers from Glasgow
Scottish footballers
Association football inside forwards
Partick Thistle F.C. players
Kirkintilloch Rob Roy F.C. players
Greenock Morton F.C. players
Barnsley F.C. players
Doncaster Rovers F.C. players
Waterford F.C. managers
Waterford F.C. players
League of Ireland players
League of Ireland managers
Scottish Football League players
English Football League players
Scottish football managers
East Stirlingshire F.C. managers
Albion Rovers F.C. managers
Hibernian F.C. non-playing staff
Manchester United F.C. non-playing staff
Scottish Junior Football Association players
Scotland junior international footballers
Drumchapel Amateur F.C. players
Scottish Football League managers
Chairmen and investors of football clubs in Scotland
Association football scouts